William Baldwin (fl. 1547) was an English author.

Life
From the West Country of England, perhaps Shropshire, or even from Wales. Nothing certain is known of Baldwin's life until 1547, when he started employment as a corrector in the London printing shop of Edward Whitchurch. Previously, he seems to have studied logic and philosophy at Oxford. During the reigns of Edward VI and Queen Mary, it appears Baldwin played an occasional role in the production of theatrical exhibitions at court, while continuing to work at the printing shop. Records of the master of the revels, Thomas Cawarden, show that he had a hand in 'a comedy concerning the way of life' and a morality play, but this cannot be confirmed. He is probably the William Baldwin who was ordained deacon by Archbishop Grindal in 1563; the same man was described as a minister in the 1587 Mirror for Magistrates, and was noted to have given up printing for an appointment in the church, viz. as vicar of Tortington, Sussex, in 1559–60; and then as rector of St Michael-le-Querne, London, in 1561. He died some time before 1 November 1563. A further possible identification is in Stowe's account in Historical Memoranda of one Baldwin preaching at Paul's Cross in September 1563, who died a week later of the plague.

Works
Baldwin wrote and published a number of works between 1547 and 1569.

The 1547 A Treatise of Morall Phylosophie, contayning the Sayinges of the Wyse, authored by Baldwin and printed by Whitchurch, was a small black-letter octavo of 142 leaves. An enlarged edition of this work was later published by Thomas Paulfreyman, and continued to be popular for a century.

In 1547 Baldwin prefixed a copy of verses to a work by Christopher Langton (1521–1578), the Treatise ordrely declaring the Principall Partes of Physick.

The 1549 Canticles or Balades of Salomon, phraselyke declared in Englyshe Metres was printed by Baldwin from the types of Whitchurch.

The 1559 Mirror for Magistrates was superintended by Baldwin, who also contributed four poems to the work. These contributions were:
 The Story of Richard, Earl of Cambridge, being put to death at Southampton;
 How Thomas Montague, Earl of Salisbury, in the midst of his glory was by chance slain by a Piece of Ordnance;
 Story of William de la Pole, Duke of Suffolk, being punished for abusing his King and causing the Destruction of good Duke Humphrey;
 The Story of Jack Cade naming himself Mortimer, and his Rebelling against the King.

In the preface, Baldwin speaks of having been 'called to other trades of lyfe.'

The 1560 The Funeralles of King Edward the Sixt; wherein are declared the Causers and Causes of his Death. was a poetical tract in twelve leaves. On the title-page is a woodcut portrait of Edward VI of England. The elegy is followed by An Exhortation to the Repentaunce of Sinnes and Amendment of Life, consisting of twelve eight-line stanzas; and the tract concludes with an Epitaph: The Death Playnt or Life Prayse of the most Noble and Vertuous Prince, King Edward the Sixt.

The 1561 Beware the Cat (also 1570 & 1584) was an early satirical piece, shown by John Payne Collier (1848) to be the work of Baldwin. He based this attribution on an entry in the Registers of the Company of Stationers of London (1568–69) and upon a strident anonymous broadsheet published circa 1561 which attacked the work as written pseudonymously by Baldwin. Prior to Collier's work, the connection had not been made with Baldwin, and the existence of a 1561 edition relies on evidence from Joseph Ritson and the discovery of the broadsheet. No edition prior to that of 1570 is known to exist, and this latter edition only exists, apart from title page and introduction, in the form of 19th century transcripts. The 1584 edition is the only original (and incomplete, missing title page) edition. In this work personal allusions abound, and there are many attacks on Roman Catholics. The purpose is to show that cats are gifted with speech and reason; and in the course of the narrative, which consists of prose and verse, a number of tales are introduced.

The 1569 A new Booke called The Shippe of Safegarde, wrytten by G. B. was probably written by Baldwin.

Anthony Wood ascribes to him a work entitled The Use of Adagies; Similies and Proverbs; Comedies, of which nothing is known.

See also
 Parody

References

Attribution

External links
 presscom.co.uk, original extant texts for 'Beware the Cat'

16th-century English poets
Alumni of the University of Oxford
English male poets
Year of birth missing
Year of death missing